Jeff Lynne's ELO: Live in Hyde Park is a concert film by Jeff Lynne's ELO.

On 14 September 2014, Jeff Lynne's ELO, accompanied by the BBC Concert Orchestra and backed by the Take That/Gary Barlow band, headlined BBC Radio 2s Festival In A Day at Hyde Park, London. The show wa the first time in almost 30 years that ELO had performed on a festival stage. 50,000 tickets for the event sold out in just under 15 minutes. The release includes interviews from the performance along with the documentary Mr. Blue Sky - The Story Of Jeff Lynne and ELO.

U.S. and Canadian versions
The U.S. and Canadian versions, released by the company Eagle Rock Entertainment, omit the final song "Roll Over Beethoven" which was included on the UK release.

Full concert songs
"All Over the World"
"Evil Woman"
"Ma-Ma-Ma Belle"
"Showdown"
"Livin' Thing"
"Strange Magic"
"10538 Overture"
"Can't Get It Out of My Head"
"Sweet Talkin' Woman"
"Turn to Stone"
"Steppin' Out"
"Handle with Care"
"Don't Bring Me Down"
"Rock 'n' Roll Is King"
"Telephone Line"
"Mr. Blue Sky"
"Roll Over Beethoven" (not included on U.S. or Canadian version)

Personnel
ELO
Jeff Lynne – lead vocals, guitars
Richard Tandy – keyboards, synthesisers, backing vocals

Backing musicians
 Chereene Allen – violin
 Marcus Byrne – keyboards
 Donavan Hepburn – drums
 Iain Hornal – backing vocals, guitar
 Melanie Lewis-McDonald – backing vocals
 Danny Marsden – trumpet
 Milton McDonald – guitar, vocals
 Lee Pomeroy – bass guitar
 Bernie Smith – keyboards
 Mike Stevens – guitar, vocals
 Mick Wilson – percussion, vocals

Certifications

References

External links

Electric Light Orchestra video albums
2015 live albums
Concert films
2015 video albums
Live video albums